NHL Breakaway 99 is an ice hockey game for the Nintendo 64 and is a sequel to NHL Breakaway 98. It was released in 1998, The cover art features Steve Yzerman of the Detroit Red Wings.

Features 
The game features the same features as Breakaway 98 did: a season mode, practice mode, playoff mode and an exhibition mode. It features all the NHL teams.

Reception 

Next Generation reviewed the Nintendo 64 version of the game, rating it two stars out of five, and stated that "NHL Breakaway '99 is nothing more than last year's version with the new rosters and rules. Try to convince us otherwise, you're wasting your breath."

The game received "mixed" reviews according to the review aggregation website GameRankings.

References

External links 
 

1998 video games
Acclaim Entertainment games
National Hockey League video games
Nintendo 64 games
Nintendo 64-only games
Ice hockey video games
Video games developed in the United States